Gibbula delgadensis is a species of sea snail, a marine gastropod mollusk in the family Trochidae, the top snails.

Description
The heightof the shell attains 3 mm.

Distribution
This species occurs in the Atlantic Ocean off the Azores.

References

 Avila S.P., Borges J.P. & Frias Martins A.M. de (2011) The littoral Trochoidea (Mollusca: Gastropoda) of the Azores. Journal of Conchology 40(4): 408–427. page(s): 413

External links
 

delgadensis
Gastropods described in 1982